Saint Anne School is a Catholic private elementary school located in Castle Shannon, Pennsylvania, US. It is part of a parish in the Roman Catholic Diocese of Pittsburgh. This school was closed by the Diocese of Pittsburgh following the 2019-2020 school year.

History
Founded in 1894, Saint Anne School was first housed in the Saint Anne Church building in Pittsburgh, Pennsylvania and initially known as the Sacristy School. Moving into a one-room schoolhouse that same year, Miss Flora Shafer taught the first class of 15 students. Subsequent classes were then taught by Sr. Bernard Murphy. Five years later, the school was more fully staffed, drawing its faculty from the Sisters of St. Agnes. By 1905, students were receiving their instruction from the Sisters of Divine Providence in the same building, which by 1912 had been expanded from one room to three floors. More than four decades later, the student body numbered 800 with peak enrollment achieved at more than 1,600 during the 1960s. They were taught by 32 faculty, 21 of whom were members of the Sisters of Divine Providence. The building principal between 1957 and 1963 was Sr. Concepta.

With an average enrollment of 80 students per grade level during the 1970s, facilities were once again expanded during that decade with Rita Adams, CDP serving as the school's principal until 1990. Cathy Jakubowski then became only the second layperson in the school's history to become the institution's principal. The current principal as of 2019 was Mrs. Harmony Stewart.

Academics
Saint Anne Catholic School was reaccredited by The Middle States Commission on Elementary Schools in the spring of 2017.

Saint Anne School offers an educational experience in four and three year preschool, full day kindergarten, and first through eighth grade with a pupil/teacher ratio of 15 students to 1 teacher, and an average class size of 20 students. In addition to the academic curriculum, daily religious education, weekly Mass and Eucharistic Adoration, sacramental preparation, Spanish, music, art, and physical education classes, and computer equipment are also provided. A scholarship program exists, as do on-site morning and after-school extended care services.

Extracurricular activities
Activities offered at Saint Anne School include PA Junior Academy of Science, Student Newspaper, Forensics, English Festival, AV Club, Lectors, Altar Servers and Lectors, Children's Choir, Spelling Bee, and Band & Advanced Band. Sporting activities that students have the ability to join are Cross-Country, Track, Cheerleading, Diocesan Football, Basketball (Varsity, Junior Varsity, and Instructional), Little Dribblers, and Volleyball (Varsity and Junior Varsity).

Notable faculty and alumni
 Daniel DiNardo, who was appointed a cardinal.  
 Dennis Miller, who became a comedian and talk show host.

References

External links
Saint Anne School website

Roman Catholic Diocese of Pittsburgh
Catholic elementary schools in Pennsylvania
Schools in Allegheny County, Pennsylvania